The men's decathlon event at the 1991 Pan American Games was held in Havana, Cuba on 7 and 8 August. Pedro da Silva, of Brazil, won the Gold Medal in this event with a score of 7,762.

Results

References

Athletics at the 1991 Pan American Games
1991